Aaronsburg is a census-designated place located in East Bethlehem Township, Washington County in the state of Pennsylvania.  The community is located just to the north of Fredericktown along Pennsylvania Route 88 which travels along the Monongahela River.  As of the 2010 census the population was 259 residents.

References

Census-designated places in Washington County, Pennsylvania
Census-designated places in Pennsylvania